Kasia Kulesza (born August 29, 1976 in Warsaw) is a Canadian competitor in synchronised swimming and Olympic medalist.

She participated on the Canadian team that received a silver medal in synchronized team at the 1996 Summer Olympics in Atlanta.

She received a gold medal in duet with Jacinthe Taillon at the 1998 Commonwealth Games in Kuala Lumpur.

References

External links

1976 births
Living people
Canadian synchronized swimmers
Olympic silver medalists for Canada
Olympic synchronized swimmers of Canada
Synchronized swimmers at the 1996 Summer Olympics
Olympic medalists in synchronized swimming
Medalists at the 1996 Summer Olympics
Commonwealth Games medallists in synchronised swimming
Commonwealth Games gold medallists for Canada
Polish emigrants to Canada
Naturalized citizens of Canada
Pan American Games medalists in synchronized swimming
Synchronized swimmers at the 1995 Pan American Games
Pan American Games silver medalists for Canada
Medalists at the 1995 Pan American Games
Synchronised swimmers at the 1998 Commonwealth Games
20th-century Canadian women
Medallists at the 1998 Commonwealth Games